Mbugua is a surname. Notable people with the surname include:

Audrey Mbugua (born 1984), Kenyan activist
Janet Mbugua (born 1984), Kenyan television personality
Judy Mbugua (born 1947), Kenyan Pentecostal pastor
Kinuthia Mbugua, Kenyan politician
Samuel Mbugua (born 1946), Kenyan boxer
Simon Mbugua (born 1991), Kenyan footballer

Bantu-language surnames